DrMaster Publications Inc. was an American distributor of manga and manhua with offices in the United States, Republic of China and Japan. It was headquartered in Fremont, California.

It began strictly as a printer of manga, and entered the publishing business after taking over most of ComicsOne's manga and manhua titles.

DrMaster's Publications Inc. went out of business around 2009 and its offices in Fremont are gone. The building was later occupied by Sunesys Telecommunications.

Manga

 888
 Freaks
 Cosplay Koromo-chan
 Dark Edge
 High School Girls
 Hinadori Girl
 Imperfect Hero
 Indian Summer
 Infinite Ryvius
 Iron Wok Jan
 Maniac Road
 Pretty Maniacs
 Premature Priest
 Red Prowling Devil
 Junk Force
Junk: Record of the Last Hero
 Onegai Twins
 Tori Koro
 Stellvia
 Stray Little Devil
 Tsukihime: Lunar Legend

Manhua
 Chronicles of the Vampire Hunter: Claws of Darkness
 Four Constables, The
 King of Fighters
 Real Fake Princess
 SNK vs Capcom
 Chinese Hero: Tales of the Blood Sword
 Divine Melody
 Feng Shui Academy

Novels
 Junk Force
 Onegai Twins
 RahXephon

References

External links

 DrMaster English website

Manga distributors
Manhua distributors
Comic book publishing companies of the United States
Companies based in Fremont, California
Publishing companies based in the San Francisco Bay Area